Stanton Community School District is a rural public school district headquartered in Stanton, Iowa. It is located in sections of Montgomery and Page counties. It has separate elementary and middle/high school divisions.

Schools
The district operates two schools on one campus in Stanton:
Stanton Elementary School
Stanton High School

Stanton High School

Athletics
The Vikings & Viqueens compete in the Corner Conference in the following sports:

Cross Country (boys and girls)
Volleyball 
Football 
Basketball (boys and girls)
Track and Field (boys and girls)
Golf (boys and girls)
Baseball 
Softball

Notable alumni
 Joni Ernst, U.S. Senator representing Iowa

See also
List of school districts in Iowa
List of high schools in Iowa

References

External links
 Stanton Community School District

School districts in Iowa
Education in Montgomery County, Iowa
Education in Page County, Iowa